Mark Fawcett is a retired American slalom canoeist who competed in the mid-to-late 1960s. He won a bronze medal in the mixed C-2 team event at the 1969 ICF Canoe Slalom World Championships in Bourg St.-Maurice.

References

External links 
 Mark FAWCETT at CanoeSlalom.net

American male canoeists
Living people
Year of birth missing (living people)
Medalists at the ICF Canoe Slalom World Championships